A berlinetta (from) is a sports coupé, typically with two seats but also including 2+2 cars. The original meaning for berlinetta in Italian is “little saloon”. Introduced in the 1930s, the term was popularised by Ferrari in the 1950s. Maserati, Opel, Alfa Romeo, and other European car manufacturers have also used the Berlinetta label. In America, Chevrolet also produced a version of the Camaro called the Berlinetta, from 1979 to 1986. The Berlinetta model was marketed as having a luxury focus, through interior features and softer suspension.

Berlinette
Berlinette is the French name for a Berlinetta, which is defined as a sporty, low-profile two-door type of automobile body style closely related to the coupé. 

After World War II, the term came to refer to a small vehicle with enclosed coachwork similar to a two-door berline, or sedan in France. It supplanted use of the term "coach" for a similar but older body style, which had replaced the even older term "demi-berline".

The most common recent usage was in reference to the Alpine A110 sports car, which was often simply called "la Berlinette".

References 

Car body styles